Amberley (Māori: Kōwai) is a town located in the Hurunui District in north Canterbury, on the east coast of the South Island of New Zealand. It is located on State Highway 1 approximately 50 km north of Christchurch. It is the seat of the Hurunui District Council. The nearest town to the north of Amberly via state highway one is Waipara (11 km) and the nearest town to the south is Leithfield (5.7 km).

History 
Amberley was established in 1864 by Mrs. Frederica Josephine Carter who owned freehold land north of the Kowai river. Mrs. Carter subdivided and sold her pastoral run for eight pounds per quarter acre. This price was very attractive as it made the land some of the cheapest in Canterbury. The town was named Amberley after Mrs. Carter's family farm in Oxfordshire, England. The earliest residents included a blacksmith, a wheelwright and a carpenter. A courthouse was established in 1870. The town developed slowly at first until the railway, built by Canterbury Provincial Railways, arrived in 1876. With the arrival of the railway, the town grew quickly and a town hall was completed in 1878 which could seat 400 people. The Anglican church was built in 1877 with room for 140 parishioners. It was destroyed by a "hurricane" in 1889 leaving only the tower standing. The church was then rebuilt at a cost of about £700. The Wesleyan church was built in 1882 with room for 120 parishioners. A branch (a two-story building) of the Bank of New South Wales was established in Amberley in 1890. In 1908 a telephone exchange was opened in Amberley. By this time Amberley had 96 houses or other dwellings and was home to more than 800 people.

In early February 2020, a fire at an illegal tyre dump containing 160,000 tyres caused significant air pollution for local residents.

Demographics

Amberley had a population of 2,067 at the 2018 New Zealand census, an increase of 486 people (30.7%) since the 2013 census, and an increase of 762 people (58.4%) since the 2006 census. There were 834 households. There were 1,002 males and 1,065 females, giving a sex ratio of 0.94 males per female. The median age was 50.3 years (compared with 37.4 years nationally), with 369 people (17.9%) aged under 15 years, 243 (11.8%) aged 15 to 29, 777 (37.6%) aged 30 to 64, and 675 (32.7%) aged 65 or older.

Ethnicities were 93.9% European/Pākehā, 7.4% Māori, 1.2% Pacific peoples, 2.8% Asian, and 2.2% other ethnicities (totals add to more than 100% since people could identify with multiple ethnicities).

The proportion of people born overseas was 17.0%, compared with 27.1% nationally.

Although some people objected to giving their religion, 50.2% had no religion, 38.6% were Christian, 0.7% were Hindu, 0.1% were Buddhist and 1.7% had other religions.

Of those at least 15 years old, 222 (13.1%) people had a bachelor or higher degree, and 432 (25.4%) people had no formal qualifications. The median income was $26,800, compared with $31,800 nationally. The employment status of those at least 15 was that 669 (39.4%) people were employed full-time, 252 (14.8%) were part-time, and 36 (2.1%) were unemployed.

Economy 
The economy in Amberley is in part based on providing services to the dairy farming, arable farming and sheep farming and grape growing industries in the wider district. Many people commute to jobs in Christchurch each day from Amberley.

Climate 
The warmest months of the year are January and February, with an average high temperature of 23 °C. The coldest month of the year occurs in July, when the average high temperature is 11 °C. Monthly rainfall ranges between an average of 48mm in January to 85mm in July.

Local information
Amberley is the seat of the Hurunui District Council.  Once a year, the local A&P (Agricultural and Pastoral) show is held, usually mid-Spring. The Amberley Swimming Pool is located at the Amberley Domain. It is a 25-yard, 5 lanes, solar heated, public swimming pool. There is also a playground, skate park, bowls club, tennis and squash courts and multiple playing fields for rugby, soccer and cricket at the Amberley Domain.

Notable buildings

The Church of the Holy Passion of our Lord 
The Catholic Church of the Most Holy Passion was built in 1866 by Sir Frederick Weld. It was moved to its Amberley site on State Highway 1 in the mid-1950s.

Holy Innocents Anglican Church 

Located on Church Street.

Cob Cottage 

The Cob Cottage is located in Chamberlain Park.  it suffered significant damage in 1975 because of gale force nor westerly winds. The damage was such that an upper floor had to be removed. It is owned by the Amberley Historical Society and houses a collection of furnishings and clothing from the early settlers of the area.

Amberley House 
Amberley House was built between 1870 and 1876. In 1920 the property was converted into the Amberley House Girls’ Collegiate School. The  house was extended by and converted into the school by building two stories to the original house. The school closed in 1942. Previous owners built extensive stables to support a horse breeding business. There are extensive grounds and it operates part time as a wedding venue and offers garden tours.

Charles Upham statue 

There is a statue in memory of Charles Upham just outside the council building. Upham farmed in the Cheviot area. Nearby the statue sit three limestone carvings, labelled The Grandmothers, which celebrate the ancient Waitaha people. Carved by Sculptor Warren Thompson, the statues were unveiled in May 2003 by the Rt. Hon. Helen Clark, Prime Minister of New Zealand.

Notable people
 Alan Johns (1917–1997), scientist, chief executive and university administrator; was born in Amberley and grew up in the town

Education

The Amberley school was established in 1872 with three classrooms. By 1902 it had 122 students. Amberley Primary School's Rewi Alley Community Centre has a memorial to Rewi Alley who attended there.

Amberley Beach 
Amberley itself sits inland on state highway one and the main train line running north from Christchurch to Picton. Amberley Beach is located 4.6 km away from Amberley on Amberley Beach Road. A small number of houses, a camping ground and the Amberley Beach Reserve are located by the beach, Amberley Beach itself is a shingle rather than a sandy beach. It is popular for walking, swimming, surfing and fishing.  The Amberley beach walkway offers a 20-minute walk of native bush and water features. The Amberley Lions helped to build this walkway.

Amberley Beach had a population of 171 at the 2018 New Zealand census, an increase of 6 people (3.6%) since the 2013 census, and an increase of 30 people (21.3%) since the 2006 census. There were 87 households. There were 84 males and 84 females, giving a sex ratio of 1.0 males per female. The median age was 49.6 years (compared with 37.4 years nationally), with 21 people (12.3%) aged under 15 years, 18 (10.5%) aged 15 to 29, 84 (49.1%) aged 30 to 64, and 48 (28.1%) aged 65 or older.

Ethnicities were 96.5% European/Pākehā, 5.3% Māori, and 3.5% other ethnicities (totals add to more than 100% since people could identify with multiple ethnicities).

Although some people objected to giving their religion, 59.6% had no religion, 24.6% were Christian and 3.5% had other religions.

Of those at least 15 years old, 18 (12.0%) people had a bachelor or higher degree, and 36 (24.0%) people had no formal qualifications. The median income was $29,100, compared with $31,800 nationally. The employment status of those at least 15 was that 57 (38.0%) people were employed full-time, 27 (18.0%) were part-time, and 3 (2.0%) were unemployed.

Amberley Golf Course 
Amberley has an 18-hole golf course that runs tournaments throughout the year. The Amberley Golf Club was founded in 1922. The golf course was originally a total of 9 holes based on sheep paddocks opposite Amberley House on state highway one. By 1940 the number of members increased to 63. Electricity was installed in the club-house. Due to World War 2, the club went into recess in 1942  and the course reverted to sheep paddocks. In 1954, a new course at Amberley Beach was proposed. With much voluntary effort a 13 holes course was formed and opened for play in 1955. Two further holes were added in 1957. The final three holes were completed in 1959.  A new club-house was also built in 1959. In 1974, a pond was excavated near the seventeenth hole which provided irrigation for the course.  Irrigating all the fairways continued to be a challenge and a new watering system was installed in 1992.

References

External links
 Information about Amberley
 Te Ara Encyclopedia: Canterbury Places

Hurunui District
Populated places in Canterbury, New Zealand